"You Could Be My Boo" is the lead single from The Almighty RSO's second album, Doomsday: Forever RSO. It was produced by Crazy C and featured R&B singer Faith Evans. "You Could Be My Boo" became Almighty RSO's only charting single, having made it to #49 on the Hot R&B/Hip-Hop Singles & Tracks and #10 on the Hot Rap Singles. The song used a sample of Yo-Yo's verse of "I Wanna Be Down (Human Rhythm Hip Hop Remix)" performed by Brandy, which features MC Lyte, Queen Latifah and Yo-Yo herself, which was released two years earlier.

Single track listing

A-Side
"You Could Be My Boo" (sanity)- 4:14
"You Could Be My Boo" (Instrumental)- 4:37

B-Side
"Sanity" (LP Version)- 4:48  
"Sanity" (Instrumental)- 4:46

1996 singles
Faith Evans songs
1996 songs